Gennaro Vitiello (15 October 1929 – 8 August 1985) was an Italian stage actor and director.  He was born in Torre del Greco in the Province of Naples.

Filmography

Teatro ESSE

Moscheta di Ruzante, 1965
La magia della farfalla di F. Garcia Lorca, 1966
Sei atti unici di J. Tardieu da J. Tardieu, 1967
Spasamiolipi di Spatola, Edoardo Sanguineti, Miccini, Achille Bonito Oliva, Pienotti
I cenci di A. Artaud, 1967
Massa-Uomo di E. Toller, 1968
Il folle, la morte e i pupi da Il folle e la morte di Hugo von Hofmannsthal e Los Titeres de cachiporra di F. G. Lorca, 1968
I negri di J. Genet, 1969
Medea da L. Anneo Seneca, 1970
K di Edoardo Sanguineti, 1971
Il re nudo di E. Schwarz, 1971
Prometeo legato di Eschilo, 1971
Il funerale del padre di G. Manganelli, 1972

Libera Scena Ensemble

Urfaust di J. W. Goethe, 1973
La morte di Empedocle da J. C. F. Hölderlin, 1973
Un matrimonio d’interesse da Los Titeres de cachiporra di F. G. Lorca, 1974
I nuovi dolori del giovane Werther di U. Plenzdorf, 1975
K – Il funerale del padre di E. Sanguineti e G. Manganelli, 1975
Padrone e sotto da Il signor Puntila e il suo servo Matti di B. Brecht, 1975
Il cacatoa verde da Arthur Schnitzler, 1977
Mammà chi è? da Il cerchio di gesso del Caucaso di B. Brecht, 1978
La storia di Cenerentola à la manière de… da Dodici Cenerentole in cerca d’autore di Rita Cirio, 1979
Woyzech di Georg Büchner, 1980
Assolo per orologio di O. Zahradnìk, 1982
Operetta per una bambola da Los Titeres de cachiporra di F. G. Lorca, 1982
Hinkemann di E. Toller, 1983
Edippo di U. Foscolo, 1983
Cabaret e forse… di G. Ranieri, 1984

References

Bibliography
Giulio Baffi, Nuovo teatro a Napoli, ETI S. Ferdinando, 1976
Franco Quadri, L’avanguardia teatrale in Italia, Einaudi Torino, 1977
Vanda Monaco, La contaminazione teatrale, Pàtron Bologna, 1981
Antonio Borriello, Samuel Beckett Krapp’s Last Tape, Esi Napoli, 1992
Leopoldo Mastelloni, The Queen of the Sea (La regina del mare), Mario Guida Editore, Napoli, 1994
Gennaro Vitiello (a cura di Luigi e Raffaele Capano), Taccuino - Ricordi e note di regia, Torre del Greco, 2003
Eduardo Sant'Elia (a cura di), Il teatro a Napoli negli anni Novanta, Tullio Pironti Editore, Napoli, 2004
Annibale Ruccello, Una commedia e dieci saggi - Scritti inediti, Gremese Editore, 2004

Italian male stage actors
Italian theatre directors
1929 births
1985 deaths
People from Torre del Greco
20th-century Italian male actors